Soused may refer to:
An informal term for being under the influence of alcohol intoxication
Soused (album), by Sunn O))) in collaboration with Scott Walker

See also
Soused herring
Souse (disambiguation)